Andrzej Drozdowski (born 22 September 1950) is a Polish footballer. He played in seven matches for the Poland national football team from 1973 to 1974.

References

External links
 

1950 births
Living people
Polish footballers
Poland international footballers
People from Pabianice
Association football defenders
ŁKS Łódź players
Zawisza Bydgoszcz players
Polish expatriate footballers
Expatriate footballers in Finland